Jernej of Loka (Bartholomew) was a 16th-century painter active in the Škofja Loka area, from which his epithet is also derived. He is known to have painted the frescoes in a number of other churches throughout the Upper Carniola region and some in the area of Tolmin (Slovenia) and in the Natisone Valley (Italy).

Churches where frescoes believed to have been painted by Jernej of Loka are preserved include:

St. Mark's Church, Vrba, between 1525 and 1530
St. John's Church, Suha
St. Peter's Church, above Begunje, between 1530 and 1540
St. John the Baptist Church, Lake Bohinj
St. Peter's Church, Bodovlje, between 1525 and 1540
St. Thomas' Church, Brode near Škofja Loka between 1530 and 1540
St. Nicholas' Church, in Godešič, around 1530
St. Lawrence's Church, above Zminec
St. Andrew's Church, at Sveti Andrej above Zminc, between 1520 and 1530
St. Oswald's Church, above Sveti Ožbolt, 1534
Sts. Phillip and James Church, in Valterski Vrh, soon after 1534
Holy Cross Church in Križna Gora
St. Bricius' Church in Četena Ravan
St. Jodocus' Church above Kranj, around 1530
St. Clement's Church, in Bukovščica
Birth of the Virgin Church in Police near Cerkno, 1536
Virgin Mary Church in Polje near Bovec, 1520–1540
Our Lady of the Snows Church above Avče near Kanal, around 1530
St. John the Baptist Church in Spodnji Otok by Mošnje
St. Mary Magdalene Church, in Brod near Bohinjska Bistrica, around 1534
St. Bartholomew's Church in San Pietro in Natisone
St. Lucy, Virgin and Martyr Church in San Leonardo in Natisone

References

Year of birth missing
Year of death missing
Carniolan painters
15th-century births
16th-century deaths
People from Škofja Loka
Fresco painters
16th-century painters